Colonia is an urban area belonging to the municipalities of Rull and Weloy which serves as the capital of the State of Yap, one of the Federated States of Micronesia.

The 2010 Census population was 3,126.

A Spanish Catholic mission was established in Colonia in 1885, during Yap's time as a colony of Spain. 

Tomil Harbor is the main port of Yap State. Ships have to travel through a  reef-bordered passageway to reach the port, where there is a  small craft wharf. There are various hotels, restaurants, shops and a medical store as well as a hospital and a bank in Colonia.

Yap is famous for its Rai stones, traditional money made of limestone, which was brought from neighbouring islands in Palau. Many rai stones are now placed in front of meetinghouses and around village courts. Many are kept along pathways called malal or stone money bank. A malal consisting of many different rai stones can be visited in the south of Colonia.

Yap Living History Museum, consisting of various buildings built in the traditional style, was founded in 2005. Sunset Park is known for its beautiful view. In World War II Public Memorial Park several war memorials were erected. Several families in Yap earn their livelihood by building pirogues traditionally. In Yap Traditional Navigation Society in Colonia, where older navigators teach navigation skills to the younger generation, pirogue-building from a newly felled tree can be observed.

Remnants of a Spanish fort dating from 1887 can be visited close to the Parliament building. Close to Yap High School, the three German Towers built around 1910 are worth a visit. They were built for telecommunication during the German colonial period of Yap. Their height amounts to approximately 20 feet. Remnants of a German dock can be visited as well.

Education
Public schools:
 Yap High School

References

External links
Yap Visitors Bureau

Municipalities of Yap